Imeon Range (‘Hrebet Imeon’ \'hre-bet i-me-'on\) is a mountain range occupying the interior of Smith Island in the South Shetland Islands, Antarctica.  Extending 30 km in southwest-northeast direction between Cape James and Cape Smith, and 6.8 km wide.  Its summit Mount Foster – summit of the South Shetlands archipelago too – is a double peak, the higher south height of which (2105 m) was first climbed on January 30, 1996 by a New Zealand team led by Greg Landreth.  Other prominent peaks include Evlogi Peak (2090 m), Antim Peak (2080 m), Mount Pisgah (1860 m), Slaveykov Peak (1760 m), Neofit Peak (1750 m), Drinov Peak (1630 m), Riggs Peak (1690 m) and Mount Christi (1280 m). First mapped by Bulgaria in 2009.

The range is named after Mount Imeon (present day Pamir, Hindu Kush, and Tian Shan), whose highlands and valleys around upper Oxus River (Amu Darya) were described as the ancient homeland of Bulgars by the seventh century Armenian geography index ‘Ashharatsuyts’ by Anania Shirakatsi.

History
The first ascent of the summit Mount Foster was made by Greg Landreth and team on 29 January 1996. Antim Peak was first ascended by the French mountaineers Mathieu Cortial, Lionel Daudet and Patrick Wagnon on 12 January 2010.  Their route called Le vol du sérac (Flight of the Serac) followed the western spur of the peak.

See also
 Smith Island
 List of Bulgarian toponyms in Antarctica

Maps
Chart of South Shetland including Coronation Island, &c. from the exploration of the sloop Dove in the years 1821 and 1822 by George Powell Commander of the same. Scale ca. 1:200000. London: Laurie, 1822.
  L.L. Ivanov. Antarctica: Livingston Island and Greenwich, Robert, Snow and Smith Islands. Scale 1:120000 topographic map. Troyan: Manfred Wörner Foundation, 2010.  (First edition 2009. )
 South Shetland Islands: Smith and Low Islands. Scale 1:150000 topographic map No. 13677. British Antarctic Survey, 2009.
 Antarctic Digital Database (ADD). Scale 1:250000 topographic map of Antarctica. Scientific Committee on Antarctic Research (SCAR). Since 1993, regularly upgraded and updated.
 L.L. Ivanov. Antarctica: Livingston Island and Smith Island. Scale 1:100000 topographic map. Manfred Wörner Foundation, 2017.

Notes

External links 
 J. Stewart. Antarctica: An Encyclopedia. Jefferson, N.C. and London: McFarland, 2011. 1771 pp.  
 Imeon Range. SCAR Composite Gazetteer of Antarctica.
 Bulgarian Antarctic Gazetteer. Antarctic Place-names Commission. (details in Bulgarian, basic data in English)
 Smith Island Expedition 2007/08
 Imeon Range. Copernix satellite image

Bulgaria and the Antarctic
Landforms of Smith Island (South Shetland Islands)
Mountain ranges
Mountain ranges of Antarctica
Landforms of the South Shetland Islands